McCarter & English, LLP, is an American full-service law firm headquartered in Newark, New Jersey. Founded in 1845, it is one of the oldest law firms in the United States. Besides its Newark headquarters, the firm has offices across the United States in Boston, East Brunswick, Hartford, Indianapolis, Miami, New York City, Philadelphia, Stamford, Wilmington, and Washington, D.C.

Practice profile
The firm's clients include Fortune 100, mid-cap, closely held, and emerging companies, and include financial, industrial, pharmaceutical, and commercial enterprises as well as educational, health care, government, and nonprofit institutions.

In February 2014, McCarter acquired the Washington, DC-based energy law firm Miller, Balis & O’Neil.

Offices
 Boston
 East Brunswick 
 Hartford 
 Indianapolis
 Miami
 New York
 Newark
 Philadelphia
 Stamford
 Wilmington
 Washington, D.C.

Notable alumni
 Robert H. McCarter, former New Jersey Attorney General (1903-1908)
 Thomas N. McCarter, former New Jersey Attorney General (1902-1903)

References

Law firms established in 1845
Law firms based in Newark, New Jersey